Newport-class tank landing ships were an improved class of tank landing ship (LST) designed for and employed by the United States Navy from 1969 to 2002. The ships were intended to provide substantial advantages over their World War II-era predecessors. Larger and faster than any previous LST design, they carried a ramp over the bow that allowed them to surpass , a goal of the United States amphibious forces. 27 were planned of which twenty were completed, the high number due to the demands of US force projection estimates. However, the arrival of the air-cushioned landing craft which allowed for over-the-horizon attacks made the class obsolete in the eyes of the United States Navy. Placed in reserve, twelve were eventually sold to foreign navies, while the remaining eight have since been decommissioned.

Design and description

However, the traditional bow door form for LSTs would not be capable of such speed. Therefore, the designers of the Newport class came up with a design of a traditional ship hull with a  aluminum ramp slung over the bow supported by two derrick arms. This made the Newport class the first to depart from the standard LST design that had been developed in early World War II.

The first three ships of the class were fitted with six General Motors 16-645-ES diesel engines, while the remainder of the class were fitted with six  ALCO 16-251 diesel engines turning two shafts, three to each shaft. The ships were also equipped with a bow thruster to allow for better maneuvering near causeways and to hold position while offshore during the unloading of amphibious vehicles.

The Newport class were larger and faster than previous LSTs and were able to transport tanks, heavy vehicles and engineer groups and supplies that were too large for helicopters or smaller landing craft to carry. The LSTs have a ramp forward of the superstructure that connects the lower tank deck with the main deck and a passage large enough to allow access to the parking area amidships. The vessels are also equipped with a stern gate to allow the unloading of amphibious vehicles directly into the water or to unload onto a utility landing craft (LCU) or pier. At either end of the tank deck there is a  turntable that permits vehicles to turn around without having to reverse. The vessels also have davits for four vehicle and personnel landing craft (LCVPs) and could carry four pontoon causeway sections along the sides of the hull.

The Newport class were initially armed with four Mark 33 /50 caliber guns in two twin turrets. They were equipped with two Mk 63 gun control fire systems (GCFS) for the 3-inch guns, but these were removed in 1977–1978. They also had SPS-10 surface search radar. Atop the stern gate, the vessels mounted a helicopter deck. They had a maximum complement of 213 including 11 officers.

United States service

Construction and career

The first vessel of the class, Newport was ordered as part of Fiscal Year (FY) 1965. The next eight were authorized in FY 1966, followed by eleven in 1967. The first three LSTs were constructed by Philadelphia Naval Shipyard in Philadelphia, Pennsylvania and the remaining seventeen by National Steel and Shipbuilding of San Diego, California. Seven more were ordered in FY 1971, but these were later deferred, then canceled. Beginning in FY 1981, ships of the class were transferred to the Naval Reserve Force.

By 1994, the 3-inch guns had been removed as a weight saving measure. The 1987 introduction of LCACs — which allowed the United States Navy to launch over-the-horizon amphibious landings — made the Newport class obsolete, but they remained with the fleet for another decade because they were the only means by which the hundreds of thousands of gallons of motor vehicle fuel needed by a Marine Expeditionary Force could be landed. Only the development of tankers with the Offshore Petroleum Discharge System (OPDS) and the later development of special fuel bladders which gave the LCACs a tanker capability allowed for their retirement.

Ships in class

Export service

Australia

Two LSTs were acquired by the Royal Australian Navy in 1994; Sagainaw on 25 August and Fairfax County on 27 September. Renamed Kanimbla and Manoora, the two vessels underwent conversion in May 1995 at Forgacs Shipbuilding, Newcastle, New South Wales. The LSTs were significantly modified by removing their bow ramps and adding another deck over the bow of the ship, allowing for a third landing spot and increased aviation fuel capacity. Over the new deck two LCM-8 landing craft are carried when the third landing spot is not used, handled by a 70-ton crane. Improved medical facilities were constructed. A hangar was installed aft, allowing for the stowage of four Seahawk helicopters. Both ships were based at Sydney, Australia.

Ships in class

Brazil
The Brazilian Navy leased one Newport-class LST from the United States on 26 August 1994. Cayuga was renamed Mattoso Maia and arrived in October. The vessel was acquired outright on 19 September 2000. Negotiations for a second vessel, Peoria, were unsuccessfully ended in 2001.

Ships in class

Chile
The Chilean Navy leased one vessel of the class from the US. A second was offered, but the ship's poor condition led to it being rejected. San  Bernardino was leased on 30 September 1995 and renamed Valdivia. In 1997, the LST ran aground and was damaged. Valdivia was refloated and repaired. Due to the age of the vessel, Valdivia was taken out of service on 14 January 2011.

Ships in class

Malaysia
The Royal Malaysian Navy acquired one Newport-class LST from the United States on 16 December 1994. A second was to be leased in 1998, but the option was not taken up. Spartanburg County arrived in Malaysia in June 1995 and was renamed KD Sri Inderapura. The vessel was refit between 1995 and 1998 at Johore. On 15 December 2002, the ship was damaged by fire. On 8 October 2009, while berthed at the Lumut Naval Base, Sri Inderapura caught fire and sank. The vessel was later raised. Sri Inderapura was officially decommissioned by the Royal Malaysian Navy on 21 January 2010.

Ships in class

Mexico

Mexico acquired two ships from the United States. Newport was purchased on 18 January 2001 and renamed Sonora by the Mexican Navy, before becoming Rio Papaloapan. Frederick was purchased on 9 December 2002 and renamed Usumacinta. Rio Papaloapan is based at Tampico and Usumacinta at Manzanillo.

Ships in class

Morocco
The Royal Moroccan Navy acquired one ship from the United States as a grant transfer on 16 August 1994. Bristol County was renamed Sidi Mohammed Ben Abdallah upon entering Moroccan service. The LST was acquired to replace the aging . By late 1995, Sidi Mohammed Ben Abdallah was considered non-operational but was later returned to service.

Ships in class

Spain
Two ships were leased by the Spanish Navy from the United States. The first, Barnstable County was recommissioned into the Spanish Navy on 26 August 1994 and renamed Hernán Cortés. The second, Harlan County, recommissioned on 14 April 1995 and was renamed Pizarro. Both ships were based at Rota, Spain. Hernán Cortés was initially to be decommissioned in 2006, but continued until 2009, when the vessel was taken out of service. The LST was scrapped at Arinaga, Gran Canaria, Spain in 2014. Pizarro was decommissioned in December 2012 and sold for scrap in February 2016 and was broken up in El Puerto de Santa Maria beginning in March.

Ships in class

Taiwan
Two ships were leased by the Republic of China Navy (ROCN) from the United States on 1 July 1995. Manitowoc and Sumter were taken to Newport News Shipbuilding and refitted before being recommissioned into the ROCN on 8 May 1997 and renamed Chung Ho and Chung Ping respectively. The two ships were purchased on 29 September 2000.

Ships in class

See also

Citations

References

External links

 Federation of American Scientists page on Newport class

Amphibious warfare vessel classes
 
 Newport class tank landing ship
 Newport class tank landing ship
Tank landing ships